The Kansas Southwestern Railway  was a railroad in the U.S. state of Kansas. It was merged into a sister railroad company, the Central Kansas Railway, in 2000.  The Central Kansas Railway was later sold to Watco Companies and became the Kansas and Oklahoma Railroad. KSW had a small roster of former Grand Trunk Western Railroad GM-Electromotive Division GP9s, 4544, 4557, 4912 and 4916.  Most were painted in a red, white and blue paint scheme. Its headquarters were located in Wichita, Kansas.  Much of the track was former Missouri Pacific spun off by the Union Pacific in 1991.

References

Defunct Kansas railroads
Railway companies established in 1992
Railway companies disestablished in 2000
OmniTRAX
Spin-offs of the Union Pacific Railroad